Kingsley Asoah-Apima (born 15 June 1950) is a Ghanaian politician and a member of the first Parliament of the fourth Republic representing the Juabeso constituency in the Western Region of Ghana. He represented the National Democratic Congress.

Early life and education 
Asoah-Apima was born on 15 June 1950 at Juaboso in the Western Region of Ghana. He attended the Wiawso Training College and obtained his GCE Ordinary Level. He also attended the School of Ghanaian Languages and obtained his Diploma in Languages.

Politics 
He was first elected into Parliament on the Ticket of the National Democratic Congress for the Juaboso Constituency in the Western Region of Ghana during the 1992 Ghanaian General Elections.

Career 
He is a teacher by profession and a former member of Parliament for the Juabeso Constituency in the Western Region of Ghana.

Personal life 
He is a Christian.

References 

Living people
1950 births
National Democratic Congress (Ghana) politicians
Ghanaian educators
Ghanaian Christians
People from Western Region (Ghana)
Ghanaian MPs 1993–1997